János Marozsán (born 13 May 1965 in Újfehértó) is a former professional Hungarian footballer.

He is the father of current German international footballer Dzsenifer Marozsán.}

References

External links 
 
 

1965 births
Living people
People from Újfehértó
Hungarian footballers
BFC Siófok players
Budapest Honvéd FC players
Budapesti VSC footballers
Pécsi MFC players
1. FC Saarbrücken players
Hungarian expatriate footballers
Expatriate footballers in Germany
Hungarian expatriate sportspeople in Germany
Association football midfielders
Hungary international footballers
Sportspeople from Szabolcs-Szatmár-Bereg County